The Paraavis Mirage is a Russian paramotor that was designed and produced by Paraavis of Moscow for powered paragliding. Now out of production, when it was available the aircraft was supplied complete and ready-to-fly.

Design and development
The Mirage was designed to comply with the US FAR 103 Ultralight Vehicles rules as well as European regulations. It features a paraglider-style wing, single-place accommodation and a single  Cors'Air M21Y engine in pusher configuration with a 2.6:1 ratio reduction drive and a  diameter two-bladed wooden propeller. The aircraft's propeller cage is built from titanium to give high strength at low weight, as is the propeller leading edge protection.

As is the case with all paramotors, take-off and landing is accomplished by foot. Inflight steering is accomplished via handles that actuate the canopy brakes, creating roll and yaw.

Reviewer Rene Coulon said of the design, "with a Cors'Air engine, its strength power and flexibility are an ideal compromise."

Specifications (Mirage)

References

Mirage
2000s Russian ultralight aircraft
Single-engined pusher aircraft
Paramotors